The 2000 Save Mart/Kragen 350 was the 16th stock car race of the 2000 NASCAR Winston Cup Series and the 12th iteration of the event. The race was held on Sunday, June 25, 2000, in Sonoma, California, at the club layout in Sears Point Raceway, a  permanent road course layout. The race took the scheduled 112 laps to complete. At race's end, Hendrick Motorsports driver Jeff Gordon would dominate the late stages of a chaotic race to win his 51st career NASCAR Winston Cup Series win and his first of the season. To fill out the podium, Sterling Marlin of Team SABCO and Mark Martin of Roush Racing would finish second and third, respectively.

Background 

Sears Point Raceway is one of two road courses to hold NASCAR races, the other being Watkins Glen International. The Chute was only used for NASCAR events such as this race, and was criticized by many drivers, who preferred the full layout.

Entry list 

 (R) denotes rookie driver.

Practice

First practice 
The first practice session was held on Friday, June 23, at 10:00 AM PST, and would last for three hours.

Second practice 
The second practice session was held on Saturday, June 24, at 9:00 AM PST, and would last for one hour.

Third and final practice 
The third and final practice session, sometimes referred to as Happy Hour, was held on Saturday, June 24 after the preliminary NASCAR Featherlite Southwest Series race.

Qualifying 
Qualifying was split into two rounds. The first round was held on Friday, June 23, at 2:00 PM PST. each driver would have one lap to set a time. During the first round, the top 25 drivers in the round would be guaranteed a starting spot in the race. If a driver was not able to guarantee a spot in the first round, they had the option to scrub their time from the first round and try and run a faster lap time in a second round qualifying run, held on Saturday, June 24, at 10:45 AM PST. As with the first round, each driver would have one lap to set a time. Positions 26-36 would be decided on time, while positions 37-43 would be based on provisionals. Six spots are awarded by the use of provisionals based on owner's points. The seventh is awarded to a past champion who has not otherwise qualified for the race. If no past champion needs the provisional, the next team in the owner points will be awarded a provisional.

Three drivers would fail to qualify: Rick Mast, Geoff Bodine, and R. K. Smith.

Full qualifying results

Race results

References 

2000 NASCAR Winston Cup Series
NASCAR races at Sonoma Raceway
June 2000 sports events in the United States
2000 in sports in California